Sardar Malik (13 January 1930 – 27 January 2006) was an Indian Hindi film music director and score composer.

Early life and career 
Sardar Malik was born on 13 January 1930 in Kapurthala, Punjab, British India. He first was a student at Uday Shankar's India Cultural Centre in Almora, Uttarkhand to learn dancing and singing. He became a trained choreographer in Kathakali, Manipuri and Bharatnatyam there. While at this institute, he also learned music from Ustad Allauddin Khan who also worked at the same centre.

Later he came to Bollywood in the late 1940s and was the music director for over 600 songs. He is known for his work for films Thokar (1953 film), Aulad (1954), Bachpan (1963 film), Maharani Padmini (1964 film), and especially his big musical hit film  Saranga (1961). Consequently he became known as the 'Saranga man'.

Death and legacy
Sardar Malik died on 27 January 2006 after prolonged illness at age 76.
Malik's wife, Bilqis, was the sister of lyricist Hasrat Jaipuri. The couple have three sons, Anu Malik, Daboo Malik, and Abu Malik. All three of his sons have followed in their father's footsteps to become music directors in Bollywood.

Selected filmography
Raaz (1949 film)
Laila Majnu (1953 film)
Thokar (1953 film) 
Aulad (1954)
Ab-E-Hayat (1955 film)
Maan Ke Aansoo (1959)
Mera Ghar Mere Bachche (1960)
Saranga (1961)
Bachpan (1963 film) 
Maharani Padmini (1964 film) 
Jantar Mantar (1964)
Gyani Ji (1977) (Punjabi Film)

References

External links

Profile of music director Sardar Malik on Indian Cinema Heritage Foundation website

Hindi film score composers
1930 births
2006 deaths
20th-century Indian composers
People from Kapurthala
Musicians from Punjab, India